The 2002 Hong Kong Open was a men's tennis tournament played on outdoor hard courts in Hong Kong in the People's Republic of China and was part of the International Series of the 2002 ATP Tour. The tournament ran from September 23 through September 29, 2002.

Champions

Men's singles

 Juan Carlos Ferrero defeated  Carlos Moyá 6–3, 1–6, 7–6(7–4)
 It was Ferrero's 2nd title of the year and the 7th of his career.

Men's doubles

 Jan-Michael Gambill /  Graydon Oliver defeated  Wayne Arthurs /  Andrew Kratzmann 6–7(2–7), 6–4, 7–6(7–4)
 It was Gambill's 2nd title of the year and the 6th of his career. It was Oliver's only title of the year and the 1st of his career.

Hong Kong Open
Hong Kong Open (tennis)
2002 in Hong Kong sport
2002 in Chinese tennis